"Song Sung Blue" is a 1972 hit song written and recorded by Neil Diamond, inspired by the second movement of Mozart's Piano Concerto #21.  It was released on Diamond's album Moods, and later appeared on many of Diamond's live and compilation albums. The song was a #1 hit on the Billboard Hot 100 chart in the United States for one week, the week of July 1, and it spent twelve weeks in the Top 40. It also made the pop chart in the United Kingdom, reaching #14 on the UK Singles Chart.

"Song Sung Blue" was Diamond's second #1 hit in the U.S., after 1970's "Cracklin' Rosie", and to date his last solo #1 song (he had a #1 duet with Barbra Streisand in 1978, with "You Don't Bring Me Flowers"). In addition, "Song Sung Blue" spent seven weeks at #1 on the adult contemporary chart. The song has become one of Diamond's standards, and he often performs it during concerts.

"Song Sung Blue" was nominated for two Grammy Awards in 1973, Record of the Year and Song of the Year. Both awards that year were won by Roberta Flack's rendition of Ewan MacColl's song, "The First Time Ever I Saw Your Face".

Cash Box said of it that "the song gives the phrase 'Everybody, sing!' new meaning."

Diamond described "Song Sung Blue" in the liner notes to his 1996 compilation album, In My Lifetime, as a "very basic message, unadorned. I didn't even write a bridge to it. I never expected anyone to react to "Song Sung Blue" the way they did. I just like it, the message and the way a few words said so many things."

Later uses
The song inspired the title of a 2008 documentary about a Neil Diamond impersonator who was married to a Patsy Cline impersonator.

Chart history

Weekly charts

Year-end charts

Cover versions
Andy Williams released a version in 1972 on his album, Alone Again (Naturally).

Hot Butter released a version in 1972 on their album Hot Butter.

Johnny Paycheck released a version in 1972 on his album Somebody Loves Me.

Sacha Distel recorded the song in French as "Chanson Bleue".

British new wave group Altered Images released a version in 1982 on the album Pinky Blue.

Bobby Darin performed the song in 1972 during his summer television show, and his version was included on the 2004 album, Aces Back to Back.

Frank Sinatra also recorded a version on his Trilogy album (1980).

The Nolan Sisters recorded a version which is on their 1978 20 Giant Hits album.

References

External links
 

1972 singles
Songs written by Neil Diamond
Neil Diamond songs
Andy Williams songs
Altered Images songs
Billboard Hot 100 number-one singles
Cashbox number-one singles
Number-one singles in New Zealand
Number-one singles in Switzerland
1972 songs
Uni Records singles
Songs about music
Song recordings produced by Tom Catalano